Kjell Kristian Rike (12 July 1944 – 19 May 2008) was a Norwegian sports commentator, originally from Byglandsfjord. He reported on biathlon events for NRK starting in 1977, and also on cross-country skiing from 1985.

He was a commentator during several football world championships, and also at golf, cycling, track and field athletics, shooting, harness racing, and alpine skiing events.

Rike was member of the original staff of the long-running TV series Norge rundt in 1976, and is credited for having suggested the signature tune for the program, "Norsk dans nr. 2" by Edvard Grieg.

He was an active sport shooter and a Norwegian champion in 1974.

He died on 19 May 2008, about a month after he was diagnosed with terminal lung cancer. He married his longtime partner, Marit Rosendahl, just a few days after being diagnosed.

Awards
2007 Gullruten honorary Norwegian TV industry award (with fellow television sports commentator Jon Herwig Carlsen).

References

1944 births
2008 deaths
People from Bygland
Norwegian television personalities
Norwegian male sport shooters
Norwegian skiing and biathlon commentators
NRK people
Norwegian sports journalists
Deaths from lung cancer
Deaths from cancer in Norway
20th-century Norwegian journalists